Doko (Iko), or Uyanga, is a minor Upper Cross River language of Nigeria.

References

Languages of Nigeria
Upper Cross River languages